Althea Rebecca Reinhardt (born 1 September 1996) is a Danish handball player for Odense Håndbold and the Danish national team.

She was part of the national team that finished 4th at the 2016 European Championship in Sweden.

Achievements
 Women's European Championship 17:
 Bronze: 2013
 Women's Youth U18 World Championship:
 Bronze: 2014
 Women's European Championship 19:
 Gold: 2015
 Women's Junior World Championship:
 Gold: 2016
 All-Star Team:
 Best Goalkeeper: 2013, 2016

References

External links

Althea Reinhardt – Odense Håndbold
Althea Reinhardt – Team Danmark
DHDb > Althea Reinhardt

1996 births
Living people
Danish female handball players
Sportspeople from Aarhus